Aina, also known as The Mirror, is a 1977 Pakistani romantic drama film directed by Nazar-ul-Islam and starring Nadeem and Shabnam. Singers are Mehdi Hassan, Mehnaz, Nayyara Noor and Alamgir. The film was a major box-office success primarily due to its music which was composed by Robin Ghosh. It became the longest-running Pakistani film at the cinemas. The movie is based on the 1973 Hindi movie Aa Gale Lag Jaa and went on to be remade in Hindi in 1985 as Pyar Jhukta Nahin.

At annual Nigar Awards, the film received 12 awards including, best film, best director, best actor, best actress, best supporting actress and best playback singer. It topped the British Film Institute's users' poll of "Top ten Pakistani films of all times" in 2002.

Plot
Aina is a love story of two hearts and two souls but from two different social classes, one being a daughter of a business tycoon i.e. Rita (Shabnam) and one being a realistic, self-confident and a little bit arrogant poor young man, Iqbal (Nadeem). Rita is a leisure girl whereas Nadeem works as a hotel receptionist and they both fall in love. The entire movie is about how a rich girl and poor man fell in love and the struggles that comes after their marriage.

Cast 
 Shabnam as Rita
 Nadeem Baig as Iqbal
 Bahar Begum as Rita's mother
 Shahzeb as Rita & Iqbal's son
 Rehan as Seth Sahab (Rita's father)
 Qavi Khan
 Zarqa As dancer 
 Khalid Saleem Motta
 Ragni as iqbal'mother
 Mukhtar begum as dadi
 Nazir Ahmed khan as seth

Soundtrack 
The film was a musical success as well and has trademark song visualizations from director Nazar-ul-Islam. The music was composed by Robin Ghosh, and the playback singers were Mehdi Hassan, Mehnaz, Alamgir, Nayyara Noor and Akhlaq Ahmed. The theme song is "" sung in a happy mood, sad mood and another song version sung by the child star at the climax of the movie.

Kabhi Mai Sochta Houn…by Mehdi Hassan
Wada Karo Saajna…by Mehnaz and Alamgir
Mujhe Dil Se Na Bhulana (happy version)…by Mehnaz and Alamgir
Haseen Wadion Se Yeh Pucho…by Akhlaq Ahmed and Nayyara Noor
Ruthey Ho Tum Tumko Kaisay Manaun Piya…by Nayyara Noor
Mujhe Dil Se Na Bhulana (sad version)…by Mehdi Hassan
Mujhe Dil Se Na Bhulana (child version)…by Nayyara Noor

Release and reception
Aina was released on 18 March 1977 in Pakistani cinemas. In Karachi, it was released on two main cinemas Bambino and Scala.

Aina is Pakistan's only Urdu film to have a crown jubilee (a mega-hit film) with a total running period of 401 weeks on all cinemas and 48 weeks on the main cinema in Karachi. The film had broken all the previous box office records and no Pakistani film has touched that record again till date.

Mushtaq Gazdar, a well-known film critic, in his book 'Pakistan Cinema 1947 - 1997', Oxford University Press, 1997 said:

"In Aina, Nazrul infused a romantic note through the songs using the elements of nature as tools to enhance their impact. His use of open spaces to create the mood of the scenes in contrast with the normal lip-sync presentation of songs greatly appealed to the audience."

This movie was so popular that it was shown in Karachi Cinemas for almost 8 consecutive years (401 consecutive weeks). The film ran to packed crowds in theaters across China as well. In the 1990s it was telecast in Bangladesh Television.

In 2002, the film topped the users' poll of "Top ten Pakistani films" conducted by British Film Institute. The film was also ranked amomg the critics' poll of the institute.

Awards 
One of its songs "" sung by Mehdi Hassan won Nigar Award for the best song of the year 1977. In total the film won 12 awards:

Remakes and possible sequel  
The 1998 Pakistani film Nikah, directed by Sangeeta, was loosely based on Aina. Another remake was made in 2013 with the same name, which starred Faisal Qureshi, Saba Qamar, directed by Sarmad Sultan Khoosat and produced by A & B Entertainment.

In April 2017, director Syed Noor announced a sequel to the film, tentatively known as Aina 2. Noor told The Express Tribune, "Of course, Aina 2 will further the story told in Aina with the original star cast members as well as some new faces. Also, we’re planning on filming it in Canada this time."

References

External links 
 

1977 films
Pakistani musical films
1970s Urdu-language films
Nigar Award winners
Urdu films remade in other languages
Films scored by Robin Ghosh
1977 romantic drama films
Pakistani romantic drama films
1970s pregnancy films
Pakistani pregnancy films
Urdu-language Pakistani films